Yenhor (Yonkhor) is a rural locality (an ulus) in Selenginsky District, Republic of Buryatia, Russia. The population was 195 as of 2010. There are 8 streets.

Geography 
Yenhor is located 51 km south of Gusinoozyorsk (the district's administrative centre) by road. Novoselenginsk is the nearest rural locality.

References 

Rural localities in Selenginsky District